Villamuriel de Cerrato is a municipality located in the province of Palencia, Castile and León, Spain. According to the 2004 census (INE), the municipality had a population of 5,304 inhabitants.

Fr Adolfo Nicolás, Superior General of the Society of Jesus (2008-2016), was born in Villamuriel de Cerrato in 1936.

References

Municipalities in the Province of Palencia